Guitar Slim Jr. (born Rodney Glenn Armstrong, August 24, 1952, New Orleans, Louisiana, United States) is an American New Orleans blues guitarist and singer. Over his lengthy playing career, he has worked with numerous other blues musicians. His debut album, Story of My Life (1988), was nominated for a Grammy Award.

Biography
Armstrong's father was the noted blues performer Guitar Slim, best known for the million-selling song "The Things That I Used to Do", which is listed in The Rock and Roll Hall of Fame's 500 Songs That Shaped Rock and Roll.

Guitar Slim Jr., has worked for many years on the New Orleans blues club circuit, and his repertoire became more reliant on his father's material. His debut album, recorded in 1988, Story of My Life, was nominated for a Grammy Award for Best Traditional Blues Album in 1989. New Orleans music historian Jeff Hannusch stated in the sleeve notes for that album that Slim Jr. "has been a fixture on the black New Orleans club circuit for the better part of 20 years...[but] doesn't get to play the posher uptown clubs."

He toured with Stevie Ray Vaughan in the late 1980s, and they remained friends until the Vaughan's death in 1990. Slim's 1996 release, Nothing Nice, featured the Memphis Horns.

His most recent recorded work was the 2010 album Brought Up the Hardway.

He played at the New Orleans Jazz & Heritage Festival in 2011.

Discography

See also
List of New Orleans blues musicians
New Orleans rhythm and blues

References

External links
Official website
Images at google.co.uk

1952 births
Living people
American male singers
American blues singers
American blues guitarists
American male guitarists
Blues musicians from New Orleans
Singers from Louisiana
Guitarists from Louisiana
20th-century American guitarists
20th-century American male musicians